Hibbertia torulosa is a species of flowering plant in the family Dilleniaceae and is endemic to a restricted area of Victoria, Australia. It is a shrublet with hairy foliage, linear leaves and yellow flowers with six stamens on one side of two hairy carpels.

Description
When grown in cultivation, flowers are present in most months.

Taxonomy
Hibbertia torulosa was first formally described in 1995 by Hellmut R. Toelken and Robert John Bates in the Journal of the Adelaide Botanic Gardens from specimens collected near the Bemm River in 1994. The specific epithet (torulosa) means "knobby", referring to the branchlets.

Distribution and habitat
This hibbertia is only known from the type collection in woodland near the Bemm River in Victoria.

See also
List of Hibbertia species

References

torulosa
Flora of Victoria (Australia)
Plants described in 1995
Taxa named by Hellmut R. Toelken